Vladimir Mikhailovich Denisov (born 29 June 1984) is a Belarusian former professional ice hockey defenseman. He last played for SaiPa of the Finnish Liiga. He participated at the 2010 IIHF World Championship as a member of the Belarusian national team.

Playing career 

Denisov played in the Russian Hockey Super League for HC Lada Togliatti in the 2006-07 season. With ambitions to play in the NHL, Vladimir signed with affiliate of the Colorado Avalanche, the Lake Erie Monsters, in the AHL for the 2007–08 season.

While using the season with the Monsters to adjust to the North American game, Denisov impressed with his physicality and signed his first NHL contract with the New York Rangers for the 2008–09 season on 10 July 2008. Denisov was assigned to AHL affiliate, the Hartford Wolf Pack, to start the season. Vladimir eclipsed previous highs for goals and assists, however frustrated from lack of opportunity with the Rangers he requested a trade in January but played the season out.

On 5 September 2009, Vladimir was invited to the Washington Capitals training camp for the 2009–10 season. Failing to earn a contract with the Capitals, and rejecting the option to try out with the Capitals affiliate, the Hershey Bears, Denisov returned to Belarus where he signed for HC Dinamo Minsk of the KHL on 29 September 2009. Denisov appeared on the Blueline in 42 games with Minsk and posted 14 points but as the team was unable to advance to the playoffs, he was not tendered a new contract.

On 29 September 2010, Denisov moved to the Swiss National League A, signing to a one-year contract with HC Ambrì-Piotta.

Denisov returned to Dinamo Minsk as a main-stay on the blueline for the following two seasons before signing a contract with KHL rival Salavat Yulaev Ufa for two-years on 22 May 2013. Before the season commenced, Denisov was traded by Ufa without having played a game to Torpedo Nizhny Novgorod on 9 September 2013.

Career statistics

Regular season and playoffs

International

References

External links
 

1984 births
Living people
Ak Bars Kazan players
Belarusian ice hockey defencemen
People from Chashniki
Expatriate ice hockey players in Russia
HC Ambrì-Piotta players
HC Dinamo Minsk players
Hartford Wolf Pack players
Khimik-SKA Novopolotsk players
HC Lada Togliatti players
Ice hockey players at the 2010 Winter Olympics
Johnstown Chiefs players
Lake Erie Monsters players
Olympic ice hockey players of Belarus
People from Navapolatsk
SaiPa players
Torpedo Nizhny Novgorod players
Traktor Chelyabinsk players
Yunost Minsk players
HK Vitebsk players
Sportspeople from Vitebsk Region